Kimi Records is an Icelandic independent record label and distribution company.

History

Kimi Records was founded in 2007 by Baldvin Esra Einarsson and his wife out of Akureyri, Iceland. The Kimi Records roster includes mainly Icelandic inde rock acts, but also includes bands belonging to other genres of music and despite its young age, Kimi records have also released non-Icelandic acts.

Kimi Records started out as a record company and distributed their own music on their own. The label has also distributed releases by artists such as FM Belfast, Hildur Guðnadóttir, Leaves, Seabear and Stórsveit Nix Noltes.

In 2009 Kimi Records started operating a sub-label, Brak Records, for more obscure Icelandic music. In its first year of operation it released one album a month. The same year Kimi Records started operating a more mainstream label, Borgin. Borgin is now in hiatus.

Kimi's first release was Hellvars' Bat out of Hellvar on November 22, 2007. Kimi's first compilation, Hitaveitan, saw the light of day in the summer 2010.

Roster

 Benni Hemm Hemm
 Borko
 Hellvar
 Hjaltalín
 kimono
 Me, The Slumbering Napoleon
 Miri
 Morðingjarnir
 Orphic Oxtra
 Prins Póló
 Retro Stefson
 Retrön
 Reykjavík!
 Sin Fang Bous
 S.H. Draumur
 Stafrænn Hákon
 Sudden Weather Change
 Swords of Chaos
 Tape Tum

See also 
 List of record labels

References

External links
Official site
Webstore
Kimi's sub-label, Brak

Icelandic independent record labels
Record labels established in 2007
Alternative rock record labels